The 1855 New Zealand general election was a nationwide vote to determine the shape of the New Zealand Parliament's 2nd term. It was the second national election ever held in New Zealand, and the first one which elected a Parliament that had full authority to govern the colony.

Background
The first New Zealand elections had been held after the passage of the New Zealand Constitution Act 1852 by the Parliament of the United Kingdom. The 1st Parliament did not have the ability to appoint the executive branch (Cabinet) of the New Zealand government, however, and a major dispute arose between Parliament and the Governor. In the 2nd Parliament, Parliament gained the powers it sought — for this reason, some see the 1855 elections, not the 1853 elections, as the beginning of New Zealand democracy.

At the time of the 1855 elections, there were no political parties in New Zealand. As such, all candidates were independents. Governments were formed based on loose coalitions, with prospective Prime Ministers needing to seek support from enough individual MPs to command a majority. This means that nobody could truly be said to have "won" an election — a government usually rose or fell based on its ability to make deals with MPs, not on election results.

The election
In the 1855 elections, voting occurred on a different day for each individual seat. The first seat was elected on 26 October, and the final seat was elected on 28 December. An estimated 9,891 people were eligible to vote, although records are poor for some areas. The number of electoral districts was 24, with some districts electing multiple MPs. The total number of seats was 37. Some parts of the colony were not part of any district, and did not have representation in Parliament.

Results

Notes

References